Amarah-Jae St. Aubyn  is an English actor known for playing the lead role in the 2020 movie Lovers Rock. She was named one of the 2020 Screen International Stars of Tomorrow.

Early life
St. Aubyn was born in England to Jamaican-Cuban and Guyanese parents and grew-up in south east London. Her father was a reggae musician.

Acting
St. Aubyn attended the Italia Conti Academy of Theatre Arts in East London.  She graduated from the BRIT School in Croydon, where she took an acting foundation course, in 2012. After a break spent in the hospitality industry, she attended the Identity School of Acting. She would go on to take a 9-month intense training course at the National Youth Theatre. In 2018 she joined the London cast of the play Harry Potter and the Cursed Child as an understudy.  Her first onscreen role came in 2020 with the movie Lovers Rock where she starred as Martha Trenton, playing alongside Micheal Ward as Franklyn Cooper.

Reception
Awards Daily described her as a "breakout star" for her role in Lovers Rock, writing "breakout star Amarah-Jae St. Aubyn celebrates the films themes of love and determination. With her strong presence on screen, it’s astonishing to learn that this is St. Aubyn's screen debut.  The Lovers Rock director, Steve McQueen said "There is a brightness and freshness about Amarah, an optimism which just reflects on the screen. Astonishingly, Small Axe was her first time on camera. She is what you call a star."

Filmography

Awards and nominations

References

External links
 
 

Living people
1994 births
21st-century English actresses
Black British actresses
British actors of Latin American descent
English people of Cuban descent
English people of Guyanese descent
English people of Jamaican descent
People from the London Borough of Lambeth